HRH may refer to:
 His or Her Royal Highness
 H.R.H. (novel), a 2006 novel by Danielle Steel
 Health human resources, also known as human resources for health
 Hereditary renal hypouricemia, a benign medical condition
 Human Resources for Health, a healthcare journal
 [,!;) ha Ben nebvyn
 McDonnell HRH, an unbuilt 1950 American compound helicopter for the US Marine Corps